George Emerick Essig  (September 2, 1838 – December 15, 1923) was an American painter, watercolorist, and etcher from Philadelphia. He specialized in marine scenes, particularly of the New Jersey coast.

Biography
George Emerick Essig was born in Philadelphia in 1838, the son of Christian and Mathilde Esig. He was a member of the Gray Reserves. His brother, Charles J. Essig, founded the University of Pennsylvania Dental School.

George Emerick Essig died in Ventnor City, New Jersey on December 15, 1923, and was interred in West Laurel Hill Cemetery.

References

Quiet, Charming Scenes Of The Delaware As It Used To Be, Edward J. Sozanski, INQUIRER ART CRITIC, January 21, 1994

External links

1838 births
1923 deaths
19th-century American painters
American male painters
20th-century American painters
Burials at West Laurel Hill Cemetery
19th-century American male artists
20th-century American male artists